is a JR West Geibi Line station located in 1-chōme, Kuchita, Asakita-ku, Hiroshima, Hiroshima Prefecture, Japan. The "Aki" in the station title is from the former name of much of the current Hiroshima Prefecture.

History

1915-04-28: Yaguchi Station opens
1937-07-01: The station name changes to Akiyaguchi Station
1987-04-01: Japanese National Railways is privatized, and Akiyaguchi Station becomes a JR West station
2007: Automatic ticket gates are scheduled to be installed during 2007

Station building and platforms
Akiyaguchi Station features one island platform capable of handling two lines simultaneously. Trains bound for Shiwaguchi and Miyoshi are handled on the upper end (上り) of the platform, and trains bound for Hiroshima are handled on the lower end (下り). The station is operated under private contract from JR West, and has a Green Window. The Akiyaguchi Station building is a one-story concrete structure.

Environs
The area surrounding Akiyaguchi Station contains many multi-unit apartment buildings, and is considered a "bedroom community" of downtown Hiroshima City. Because of this, this station handles a high volume of passengers daily, especially in the morning and evening commuting hours on weekdays. The Ōta River is found to the west of the station, and the Asa Ōhashi, a bridge on the Sanyō Expressway, is directly north of the station.
Suikō Apartments
Kuchita Post Office
Hiroshima Municipal Kuchita Junior High School
Hiroshima Municipal Kuchita Higashi Elementary School
Hiroshima Municipal Ochiai Elementary School
Hiroshima Municipal Kuchita Elementary School
Hiroshima Municipal Kawauchi Elementary School
JR West Kabe Line Midorii Station
JR West Kabe Line Shichikenjaya Station
JR West Kabe Line and Hiroshima Rapid Transit Astramline Ōmachi Station
Ōta River (太田川)

Highway access
Sanyo Expressway Takataba Hiroshima Interchange
Japan National Route 54
 Hiroshima Prefectural Route 37 (Hiroshima-Miyoshi Route)
 Hiroshima Prefectural Route 38 (Hiroshima-Toyohira Route)
 Hiroshima Prefectural Route 270 (Yagi-Midorii Route)
 Hiroshima Prefectural Route 271 (Yagi Route)
 Hiroshima Prefectural Route 459 (Yaguchi-Yasufuruichi Route)

Connecting lines
All lines are JR West lines. 
Geibi Line
Miyoshi Express (#1, 2, 5, 6, 7, 8)
No stop
Miyoshi Express (#3, 4)
Shimofukawa Station — Akiyaguchi Station — Yaga Station
Commuter Liner
No stop
Miyoshi Liner/Local
Kumura Station — Akiyaguchi Station — Hesaka Station

External links
 JR West

Railway stations in Hiroshima Prefecture
Geibi Line
Hiroshima City Network
Stations of West Japan Railway Company in Hiroshima city